Laura M. Dickey is a US Coast Guard Rear Admiral who is the deputy commander of the Coast Guard Atlantic Area. She is a former Commander of the Fifth Coast Guard District.

Early life and education
Dickey was born in Wilmington, Delaware.  Her father was a graduate of the US Coast Guard Academy who was later stationed near Wilmington and the East Coast.

In 1986, Dickey graduated from New Hanover High School in Wilmington, Delaware. After high school graduation, Dickey attended the U.S. Coast Guard Academy, graduating in 1990 with a Bachelor of Science in Government. In 2002, Dickey graduated with a Juris Doctor from the University of North Carolina School of Law 

She is licensed to practice law in North Carolina.

Military service
After graduating from the US Coast Guard Academy, Dickey became a cutterman performing search and rescue, coastal law enforcement and homeland protection.
She later attended the Naval Justice School, graduating with honors.

Dickey served as the Deputy Director of Operations for United States Northern Command.  She has also served as then-Vice President of the United States Joseph Biden’s Special Advisor for Homeland Security, Counterterrorism and Africa. 

She has been stationed throughout the globe including the Arctic, Latin America, the Bering Sea, the Middle East, and the Caribbean.

In 2012, Dickey graduated from the U.S. Naval War College with a Master of Arts in National Security and Strategic Studies.

On April 27, 2018, the US Coast Guard promoted Dickey to the rank of Rear Admiral.  At the time, she became only one of eight women to be promoted to US Coast Guard Rear Admiral. 
 
In September 2020, Dickey became the commander of the Fifth Coast Guard District. She relinquished command in May 2022 to Shannon N. Gilreath.

Awards and commendations
 Defense Superior Service Medal
 Coast Guard Achievement Medal - 2X
 Legion of Merit 
 Meritorious Service Medal - 4X
 Coast Guard Commendation Medals - 3X 
 Vice Presidential Service Badge

References

Living people
People from Wilmington, Delaware
Military personnel from Delaware
Recipients of the Legion of Merit
United States Coast Guard Academy alumni
United States Coast Guard admirals
Year of birth missing (living people)